Imprint or imprinting may refer to:

Entertainment
 Imprint (TV series), Canadian television series
 "Imprint" (Masters of Horror), episode of TV show Masters of Horror
 Imprint (film), a 2007 independent drama/thriller film
 Imprint Entertainment, film and TV production and management company
 Imprint Records, American country music record label
 Imprint (John Patitucci album), jazz album
 Imprint (Vision of Disorder album), 1998 album
 Imprint label, a recording trade name

Publishing and journalism
 Imprint, British term comparable to American masthead
 Imprint (trade name), publisher's trade name under which works are published
 Imprint (typeface), typeface commissioned from Monotype by the London publishers of The Imprint
 Imprinted stamp, a stamp printed onto a piece of postal stationery
 The Imprint (printing trade periodical), printed in London in 9 issues in 1913
 Imprint (newspaper), a student newspaper of the University of Waterloo, in Ontario, Canada
 Imprint, a part of Macmillan Publishers Children’s Publishing Group.

Science
 Molecular imprinting, in polymer chemistry
 Imprinting (psychology), in psychology and ethology
  Video imprint, in video content analysis of computer vision
 High-level human behavior
 IMPRINT (Improved Performance Research Integration Tool), human performance modeling tool based on MANPRINT, developed by U.S. Army
 Imprinting (organizational theory), in organizational theory and organizational behavior
 Unconscious physiological processes:
 Genomic imprinting (genetic imprinting), mechanism of regulating gene expression
 Limbic imprint, process by which prenatal, perinatal, and post-natal experiences imprint on limbic system
 Metabolic imprinting, phenomenon by which the metabolism of a developing fetus may be "programmed" during gestation

Other uses
 Imprint (sculpture), a glass sculpture made by Luciano Fabro

See also
 
 
 
 
 Impr.
 Imprimatur